Adeos may refer to:

Computer 
 Adaptive Domain Environment for Operating Systems, a hardware abstraction layer

Space 
 ADEOS I, a Japanese satellite launched in 1996
 ADEOS II, a Japanese satellite launched in 2002